Unxia is a genus of beetles in the family Cerambycidae, containing the following species:

 Unxia gracilior (Burmeister, 1865)
 Unxia insignis (Guérin-Méneville, 1844)
 Unxia laeta (Guérin-Méneville, 1844)

References

Unxiini